Taras Bybyk Igorovych (born 27 March 1992) is a Ukrainian male track and field athlete who competes in the 400 metres and 800 metres.

Career
His greatest achievements came in the 2013 season. He won his first national title indoors then finished fifth at the European Athletics Indoor Championships. He won 800 m silver at the European Athletics U23 Championships before representing Ukraine at the 2013 World Championships in Athletics.

Born in Chernivtsi, he competed in age-category events for his country, including the Gymnasiade, World Junior Championships in Athletics and European Athletics Junior Championships. He stopped competing internationally after 2014.

International competitions

National titles
Ukrainian Indoor Championships
800 m: 2013

References

External links

Living people
1992 births
Ukrainian male sprinters
Ukrainian male middle-distance runners
World Athletics Championships athletes for Ukraine
Sportspeople from Chernivtsi